Elżbiecin may refer to the following places:
Elżbiecin, Kuyavian-Pomeranian Voivodeship (north-central Poland)
Elżbiecin, Biała Podlaska County in Lublin Voivodeship (east Poland)
Elżbiecin, Chełm County in Lublin Voivodeship (east Poland)
Elżbiecin, Grajewo County in Podlaskie Voivodeship (north-east Poland)
Elżbiecin, Łomża County in Podlaskie Voivodeship (north-east Poland)
Elżbiecin, Świętokrzyskie Voivodeship (south-central Poland)
Elżbiecin, Ciechanów County in Masovian Voivodeship (east-central Poland)
Elżbiecin, Gmina Krasnosielc in Masovian Voivodeship (east-central Poland)
Elżbiecin, Żuromin County in Masovian Voivodeship (east-central Poland)
Elżbiecin, Greater Poland Voivodeship (west-central Poland)
Elżbiecin, Warmian-Masurian Voivodeship (north Poland)